Meese may refer to:

Geography
Meese (river) Shropshire, England

People
Edwin Meese (1931) American attorney general
Meese Report
David Meese (1723–1770) Dutch botanist
Jonathan Meese (1970) German painter, sculptor, performance artist
Jules Meese (1896–1968) French weightlifter 
Matt Meese (1983) American sketch comedian and actor
Patrick and Nathan Meese, of Meese (band)
Reg Meese (1927–2005) was an Australian rules footballer
Ward Meese (1897–1968) American football player

Other
Meese (band) rock band from Denver
Used humorously and incorrectly as a plural for moose.

See also
Meece (disambiguation)
River Mease, English Midlands
Mice